Bethanie Mattek-Sands and Horia Tecău were the defending champions, but lost in the first round to Lucie Hradecká and František Čermák.

Jarmila Gajdošová and Matthew Ebden won their first mixed doubles title, defeating Hradecká and František Čermák in the final, 6–3, 7–5. This would be Gajdošová's only Grand Slam title before her retirement in 2017.

Seeds

Draw

Finals

Top half

Bottom half

References
 Main Draw
 2013 Australian Open – Doubles draws and results at the International Tennis Federation

Mixed Doubles
Australian Open (tennis) by year – Mixed doubles